Alabama House of Representatives, District 3 is one of 105 districts in the Alabama House of Representatives. Its current representative is Andrew Sorrell. It was created in 1966 and encompasses parts of Colbert, Lauderdale and Lawrence counties. As of the 2010 census, the district has a population of 42,348, with 77.9% being of legal voting age.

Representatives
Source=

General Elections
Source=

References

03
1967 establishments in Alabama